Marek Schwarz (born April 1, 1986) is a Czech professional ice hockey goaltender currently playing for the HC Sparta Prague.

Playing career
As a youth, Schwarz played in the 2000 Quebec International Pee-Wee Hockey Tournament with a team from Chomutov. He played junior ice hockey in his native Czech Republic with HC Sparta Praha.  He made his debut at the senior level with Sparta Praha playing one game in the Czech Extraliga in 2002–03.  The following season, he joined the Extraliga full-time at seventeen-years-old and played between three teams – HC Plzeň, HC Oceláři Třinec and Sparta Praha.  That off-season, Schwarz was drafted 17th overall by the St. Louis Blues in the 2004 NHL Entry Draft.

Upon being drafted, he moved to North America to play major junior in the Western Hockey League (WHL) with the Vancouver Giants. He posted a 2.67 GAA and a winning record before moving back to the Czech Republic the following season to continue to play for Sparta Praha.

In 2006–07, he began playing for the Peoria Rivermen, the Blues' American Hockey League (AHL) affiliate. He was called up that season and played in his first NHL game on December 12, 2006, against the Chicago Blackhawks.  Schwarz made 21 saves on 24 shots as the Blues lost 3–2. At 20 years old, he became the third youngest goaltender in Blues history to play in a game.

On October 25, 2008, Schwarz combined with third-string goalie Ben Bishop for a 4-0 shutout against the Florida Panthers.  With Manny Legacé and Chris Mason out due to injuries, Schwarz was called up to play backup to Bishop when Bishop also went down with an injury in the third period. Schwarz completed the shutout with 15 minutes to go.

Career statistics

Regular season

Playoffs

References

External links

1986 births
Living people
BK Mladá Boleslav players
Czech ice hockey goaltenders
HC Bílí Tygři Liberec players
HC Oceláři Třinec players
National Hockey League first-round draft picks
Sportspeople from Mladá Boleslav
Peoria Rivermen (AHL) players
St. Louis Blues draft picks
St. Louis Blues players
Vancouver Giants players
Czech expatriate ice hockey players in Canada
Czech expatriate ice hockey players in the United States
Czech expatriate ice hockey players in Finland